Braden River High School is a public high school in Bradenton, Florida, United States. It is a part of the School District of Manatee County.

History
Braden River High School opened in August 2005.

Athletics
Braden River's colors are maroon, black, and silver and their mascot is the Pirate. They offer the following sports programs:

Marching band
Braden River's marching band has won five 3A Florida Marching Band State Championships.

Demographics
As of the 2020–2021 school year, Braden River enrolled 1,733 students. 921 identified as white, 503 identified as Hispanic, 146 identified as black, 80 identified as Asian, 75 identified as multi-racial, eight identified as American Indian/Alaska Native, and none identified as Native Hawaiian/Pacific Islander.

Notable alumni
 Tyler Dyson, MLB pitcher in the Washington Nationals organization
 Sharrod Neasman, NFL free safety for the New York Jets
 Myles Straw, MLB outfielder for the Cleveland Indians
 Sam Woolf, singer-songwriter and former American Idol contestant

References

External links
 

High schools in Manatee County, Florida
Public high schools in Florida
2005 establishments in Florida
Educational institutions established in 2005